Sidney "Sid"/"Syd" Smith was a professional rugby league footballer who played in the 1920s and 1930s. He played at club level for the Featherstone Rovers (Heritage № 84).

Playing career
Sidney Smith made his début for the Featherstone Rovers on Saturday 30 March 1929.

References

External links

Search for "Smith" at rugbyleagueproject.org

Featherstone Rovers players
Place of birth missing
Place of death missing
English rugby league players
Year of birth missing
Year of death missing